Ponmudiyār (Tamil: பொன்முடியார்) was a poetess of the Sangam period, to whom four verses of the Sangam literature have been attributed, including verse 14 of the Tiruvalluva Maalai.

Biography
Ponmudiyar lived during the time of the Chera king Thagadur Erindha Peruncheral Irumporai. She was the well-wisher of the Athiyaman king Nedumananji, who is known for giving an eternal gooseberry fruit to Avvaiyar I, and has written in praise of him.

Contribution to the Sangam literature
Ponmudiyar wrote four Sangam verses, including three in Purananuru (verses 299, 310, and 312) and one in Tiruvalluva Maalai (verse 14).

Views on Valluvar and the Kural
Ponmudiyar opines about Valluvar and the Kural text thus:

See also

 List of Sangam poets
 Sangam literature
 Tiruvalluva Maalai

References

Sources

 

Tamil philosophy
Tamil poets
Sangam poets
Female poets of the Sangam Age
Tiruvalluva Maalai contributors
Hindu poets
Ancient Indian poets
Ancient Asian women writers
Indian women poets
Ancient Indian women writers